Albert Adams may refer to:

Albert J. Adams (1845–1906), American racketeer
James Adams (bishop of Barking) (Albert James Adams, 1915–1999), Anglican bishop

See also
Bert Adams (disambiguation)